The State Academy of Fine Arts Stuttgart (German: Staatliche Akademie der Bildenden Künste Stuttgart) is a university in Stuttgart, Germany. Founded on 25 June 1761, and located since 1946 on the Weißenhof, the Academy, whose historical significance marks names such as Nicolas Guibal, Johann Heinrich von Dannecker, Bernhard Pankok, Adolf Hölzel, Willi Baumeister, Herbert Hirche, K.R.H. Sonderborg, Alfred Hrdlicka, Heinz Edelmann, Marianne Eigenheer, Richard Sapper, Joseph Kosuth, David Chipperfield, Joan Jonas, Micha Ullman, offers from all art universities in the federal state Baden-Württemberg the largest numbers of courses, namely all disciplines of the visual field, and not just in an organizational network but also under one roof. This is essentially the result of the connection of the former Academy of Fine Arts (Württembergische Akademie der bildenden Künste) with the former School of Applied Arts (Württembergische Staatliche Kunstgewerbeschule) in 1941 as Staatliche Akademie der bildenden Künste Stuttgart, which was reconstituted by Theodor Heuss in 1946 under the same name and which aimed at a broad training program as well as an intensified development in the following decades. Under the rectorate of Wolfgang Kermer, on 22 February 1975, the ″Gesetz über die Kunsthochschulen im Lande Baden-Württemberg (Kunsthochschulgesetz)″ passed by the Landtag of Baden-Württemberg came into force, which for the first time in the history of the State Academy of Fine Arts Stuttgart regulated the status and the essential relationships and which guaranteed the equality of rank with universities.

History 
On 25 June 1761, Charles Eugene, Duke of Württemberg, established in his New Palace located in the center of Stuttgart an Académie des Arts, ″where youth can develop as young plants in a nursery″.

This institution, which also spent ten years in Ludwigsburg together with the ducal court, lost its attraction after a second educational institution founded by Charles Eugene, which gained in scope and importance and increasingly devoted itself to art education, so that the Académie des Arts last existed only by name. It was the Karlsschule, an elite school with military education methodes, which went back to an orphanage founded in 1770 near Castle Solitude for poor soldiers' children and which moved in 1775 – after being converted into a military academy (Militärakademie) in 1773 – from the Castle Solitude in its own building (built according to the plans of the court architect Johann Christoph David Leger, destroyed in World War II), situated behind the New Palace in Stuttgart. In 1781 the Karlsschule was raised by Emperor Joseph II to university status under the name Karls Hohe Schule.

At the local art department, whose lessons temporary were also attended by Friedrich Schiller, artists such as Johann Heinrich von Dannecker, Philipp Friedrich von Hetsch, Joseph Anton Koch, Gottlieb Schick found their education with court painters such as Nicolas Guibal and Adolf Friedrich Harper, professors, who had already taught at the Académie des Arts. Unique was the print workshop, founded in 1776 under the copper engraver Johann Gotthard von Müller.

After the death of Duke Charles Eugene (1793), the Hohe Karlsschule was disbanded in 1794 by his brother and successor Louis Eugene, Duke of Württemberg. Thus Württemberg lost its only state art training center.

After 35 years, in 1829,  King William I of Württemberg founded an art school in Stuttgart, but initially in conjunction with other educational institutions (Vereinigte Kunst-, Real- und Gewerbe-Schule). From humble beginnings, separated in 1832 from the other institutions, the ″Royal art school″ (Königliche Kunstschule) gradually developed as a training center, which received under the direction of Leopold Graf von Kalckreuth in 1901 the title ″Royal academy of fine arts″ (Königliche Akademie der bildenden Künste, after 1918 Württembergische Akademie der bildenden Künste).

Under the Nazi regime, in 1941, the academy was organically linked with the School of Applied Arts (Württembergische Staatliche Kunstgewerbeschule, founded in Stuttgart in 1869) under the name Staatliche Akademie der Bildenden Künste Stuttgart (State Academy of Fine Arts Stuttgart), with each institution retaining its previous location. After World War II, the institution maintained this name when it was reconstituted in 1946 from Theodor Heuss, the first Minister of Education and Cultural Affairs in the state of Württemberg-Baden, with free and applied disciplines. At that time, as her own buildings in downtown Stuttgart (Urbanstraße 37/39) had been destroyed during air raids in 1943 and 1944, the academy moved into the building of the former School of Applied Arts, built on the Weißenhof in 1913 under the direction of Bernhard Pankok. Already in 1906 Pankok had suggested the connexion of the Royal Academy of Fine Arts and the Royal School of Applied Arts and her workshops (Lehr- und Versuchswerkstätte, founded in 1901). He had planned, more than ten years before the Bauhaus, an art school uniting all artistic disciplines on the Weißenhof area, but had found no resonance in Stuttgart. It was not until the winter semester of 1956/57 that the academy was extended for the first time on the Weißenhof area with the move into a newly built ″Sculptor′s building″ (″Bildhauerbau″).

In 1950 – you could study painting, glass painting, sculpture, free and applied graphics, interior and furniture design (″Innenarchitektur und Möbelbau"), textiles, ceramics, metal and art teaching – the following professors taught under the rectorate of the sculptor Hermann Brachert, who was involved with the reorganization of the academy: Trude Barth, Otto Baum, Willi Baumeister, Walter Brudi, Rudolf Daudert, Hans Fegers, Eugen Funk, Gerhard Gollwitzer, Peter Otto Heim, Manfred Henninger, Karl Hils, Eberhard Krauß, Hans Meid, Hugo Peters, Karl Rössing, Harmi Ruland, Hermann Sohn, Karl Hans Walter, Hans Warnecke, Kurt Wehlte, Hans Wentzel, Karl Wiehl, Rudolf Yelin. The architect Adolf G. Schneck, the typographer and calligrapher F. H. Ernst Schneidler (both NSDAP members, classified as Mitläufer in the denazification process) and the color chemist Hans Wagner (biographical data unkwon), the only ones from the earlier, before 1945 extensive staff had been taken over into the newly constituted State Academy of Fine Arts Stuttgart, including the painter Fritz Steisslinger, who was active from 1946 – these four professors had already left the academy for various reasons before 1950.

After the Protests of 1968 at the State Academy of Fine Arts Stuttgart, the effects of which were reflected in numerous newspapers until the early 1970s, after the justified criticism from the students for unclear legal relationships and the lack of study and examination regulations, protests against authoritarian professors, nepotism and membership in the Nazi Party, the university was fundamentally reformed under the rectorate of the art historian Wolfgang Kermer in 1975 and 1978 on the basis of new university laws for the art and music colleges of Baden-Württemberg. The legal status was clarified and guaranteed the equality of rank with universities. The academy decided on a new basic order, dissolved the old departmental structure and formed various specialist groups and study programs. In the 1970s also diplomas for all design courses were introduced and the promotion of talented students through state-funded exhibitions and publications was institutionalized. Since 1975, the State Academy of Fine Arts Stuttgart has had its own art collection, founded by rector Wolfgang Kermer and comprising the works of current and former teachers as well as alumni. This era created the foundation on which the State Academy of Fine Arts Stuttgart stands today.

In the more than 250 years of her changeful history, prominent artists and teachers have marked the path of the State Academy of Fine Arts Stuttgart, from Nicolas Guibal, Johann Heinrich von Dannecker, Philipp Friedrich von Hetsch, Nikolaus Friedrich von Thouret, Bernhard von Neher, Leopold Graf von Kalckreuth, Carlos Grethe, Bernhard Pankok, Adolf Hölzel, Heinrich Altherr, Anton Kolig to Willi Baumeister, Herbert Hirche, K.R.H. Sonderborg, Wolfgang Kermer, Alfred Hrdlicka, Heinz Edelmann, Richard Sapper, Joseph Kosuth, Micha Ullman, David Chipperfield, Joan Jonas, as well as prominent artists such as Heinrich Füger, Karl Hofer, Willi Baumeister, Oskar Schlemmer, Hermann Stenner, Johannes Itten, Ida Kerkovius, Camille Graeser, HAP Grieshaber, Grete Stern, Frans Krajcberg, Charlotte Posenenske, Ludwig Wilding, Georg Karl Pfahler, Robert Gernhardt, Karin Sander, Michel Majerus are among their alumni.

Rectors (since 1946) 
 1946–1953 Hermann Brachert, sculptor
 1953–1955 Karl Rössing, graphic artist
 1955–1957 Manfred Henninger, painter
 1957–1959 Rudolf Yelin (The Younger), glass painter
 1959–1969 Walter Brudi, book artist and typographer
 1969–1971 Herbert Hirche, architect, furniture and product designer
 1971–1984 Wolfgang Kermer, art historian
 1984–1987 Manfred Kröplien, graphic designer
 1987–1991 Paul Uwe Dreyer, painter
 1991–1994 Wolfgang Henning, architect
 1994–1998 Klaus Lehmann, product designer
 1998-2004 Paul Uwe Dreyer, painter
 2004-2010 Ludger Hünnekens, archaeologist and cultural manager
 2010–2016 Petra Olschowski, art historian and journalist
 2017–2022 Barbara Bader, art scientist and art didactic

Prominent teachers 
 Heinrich Altherr
 Heba Y. Amin
 Fritz Auer
 Willi Baumeister
 Johann Wilhelm Beyer
 David Chipperfield
 Johann Heinrich von Dannecker
 Christophe de la Fontaine
 Alexander Eckener
 Heinz Edelmann
 Marianne Eigenheer
 Reinhard Heinrich Ferdinand Fischer
 Rainer Ganahl
 Carlos Grethe
 Jakob Grünenwald
 Nicolas Guibal
 Adolf Friedrich Harper
 Robert von Haug
 Philipp Friedrich von Hetsch
 Herbert Hirche
 Adolf Hölzel
 Alfred Hrdlicka
 Christian Jankowski
 Joan Jonas
 Leopold Graf von Kalckreuth
 Albert Kappis
 Friedrich von Keller
 Wolfgang Kermer
 Anton Kolig
 Joseph Kosuth
 Aylin Langreuter
 Christian Landenberger
 Christian Friedrich von Leins
 Sándor Liezen-Mayer
 Alisa Margolis
 Erich Mönch
 Johann Gotthard von Müller
 Bernhard von Neher
 Hannes Neuner
 Chris Newman
 Bernhard Pankok
 Robert Pötzelberger
 Heinrich von Rustige
 Richard Sapper
 Philipp Jakob Scheffauer
 Hans Erich Slany
 K.R.H. Sonderborg
 Giuseppe Spagnulo
 Gottlob Friedrich Steinkopf
 Patrick Thomas
 Nikolaus Friedrich von Thouret
 Niklaus Troxler
 Micha Ullman
 Jörg F Zimmermann

Alumni 
 Max Ackermann
 Leonor Antunes
 Ellen Auerbach
 Karl Bauer
 Philipp Bauknecht
 Willi Baumeister
 Alf Bayrle
 F. W. Bernstein (1938–2018), poet, cartoonist, satirist and academic
 Bernhard Buttersack
 Eric Carle
 Karl Caspar
 Maria Caspar-Filser
 Gustav Paul Closs
 Johann Heinrich von Dannecker
 Carl Ebert (painter)
 Carl Eytel
 Christophe de la Fontaine
 Stefan Diez
 Fritz Faiss
 Reinhard Heinrich Ferdinand Fischer
 Adolf Fleischmann
 Heinrich Füger
 Peter Gamper
 Jakob Gauermann
 Robert Gernhardt
 Oskar Glöckler
 Camille Graeser
 HAP Grieshaber
 Jakob Grünenwald
 Hermann Haller
 Armin Hansen
 Ferdinand Hartmann
 Sandra Hastenteufel
 Philipp Friedrich von Hetsch
 Ludwig Hirschfeld Mack
 Karl Hofer
 Renate Hoffleit
 Johannes Itten
 Georg Jauss
 Erich Kahn
 Friedrich von Keller
 Ida Kerkovius
 Wolfgang Kermer
 Fyodor Khitruk
 Byung Chul Kim
 Günther C. Kirchberger
 Joseph Anton Koch
 Frans Krajcberg
 Susanne Kriemann
 Angela Laich
 Christian Landenberger
 Peter Lenk
 Johann Friedrich Leybold
 Käthe Loewenthal
 James McGarrell
 Paul Maar
 Michel Majerus
 Otto Meyer-Amden
 Erich Mönch
 Louis Moilliet
 Johann Gotthard von Müller
 Heinrich Nauen
 Rolf Nesch
 Vera Neubauer
 Christoph Niemann
 August Friedrich Oelenhainz
 Carl Offterdinger
 Werner Pawlok
 Alfred Heinrich Pellegrini
 
 Georg Karl Pfahler
 Hermann Pleuer
 Charlotte Posenenske
 Lilo Ramdohr
 Aiga Rasch
 Lilo Rasch-Naegele
 Günther Raupp
 Otto Reiniger
 Regina Relang
 Anselm Reyle
 Luisa Richter
 Karin Sander
 Philipp Jakob Scheffauer
 Gottlieb Schick
 Adolf Schill
 Rudolf Schlichter
 Oskar Schlemmer
 Ilse Schüle
 Hermann Stenner
 Charlie Stein
 Grete Stern
 Nikolaus Friedrich von Thouret
 Georg Trump
 Tesfaye Urgessa
 Eberhard Georg Friedrich von Wächter
 Emil Rudolf Weiß
 Willy Wiedmann
 Ludwig Wilding
 Peter Zimmermann
 Heinrich von Zügel
 Georg Friedrich Zundel
 Nijolė Šivickas

Honorary Members / Honorary Senators of the Academy

Honorary Members of the Académie des Arts 
 Anna Dorothea Therbusch (1762)

Honorary Members of the State Academy of Fine Arts Stuttgart (appointment period 1942–1999) 
 Bernhard Pankok (1942)
 Ida Kerkovius (1962)
 Rolf Nesch (1962)
 Wilhelm Wagenfeld (1962)
 Walter Gropius (1968)
 Karl Schmidt-Rottluff (1964)
 Erich Mönch (1975)
 Hannes Neuner (1976)
 Camille Graeser (1977)
 Herbert Hirche (1977)
 Oswald Oberhuber (1982)

Honorary Senators (appointment period 2004 to today) 
 Wolfgang Kermer (2004)
 Oswald Oberhuber (2004)
 Gerd Hatje (2006)

Against forgetting

Alumni of the Stuttgart art schools, who died in the Holocaust 
  (1881–1942)
  (1891–1942)
  (1880–1943)
 Käthe Löwenthal (1878–1942)
  (1894–1943)
 Marianne Weil (1909–1942)

Artists, who participated in the Stuttgart Jewish art exhibitions in 1935 and / or 1937, presumably studied at the Stuttgart art schools and whose fate is unknown 
 Ly Bernheimer
 Hilde Brandt
 Trude Munk
 Else Samuel

Alumni from the Stuttgart art schools who survived the Holocaust 
 Ellen Auerbach (1906–2004)
  (1898–1971)
  (1907–1989)
 Paul Elsas (1896–1981)
  (1897-1986)
  (1891–1976); art studies in Stuttgart not cleared
 Liselotte Grschebina (1908–1994)
  (1933–2014)
  (1891–1966); art studies in Stutttgart not cleared
  (1887–1974)
 Erich Kahn (1904–1980)
 Hermann Kahn (Aharon Kahana) (1905–1967)
  (1885–1975)
 Fyodor Khitruk (1917–2012)
 Frans Krajcberg (1921–2017)
  (1882–1945)
 Charlotte Posenenske (1930–1985)
  (1900–1987)
 Grete Stern (1904–1999)

References

External links 
 Official site

Educational institutions established in 1761
Art schools in Germany
Universities and colleges in Baden-Württemberg
Education in Stuttgart
History of Stuttgart
1761 establishments in Europe